Caledonians is the English language translation of the Latin word Caledonii, referring to the enemies of the Roman Empire in Caledonia (modern Scotland).

Caledonians may also refer to:
 Caledonians, often in a light-hearted context, used as an alternative word to Scots, Scottish or Scotch, to refer to people who live in, or come from, Scotland.
 Caledonians, a square dance for eight resembling the quadrille.
 Residents of New Caledonia.
 Russians in the United Kingdom

See also
Caledonian (disambiguation)
Caledonia